The 1948 United States Senate election in Kentucky took place on November 2, 1948. Incumbent Republican Senator John Sherman Cooper, who won a 1946 special election to fill the vacant seat of Commissioner of Baseball Happy Chandler, ran for a full term in office but was defeated by Democratic U.S. Representative Virgil Chapman.

General election

Candidates
Virgil Chapman, U.S. Representative from Lexington (Democratic)
John Sherman Cooper, incumbent Senator since 1946 (Republican)
David R. Cox (Socialist Labor)
W. A. Standefur (Socialist)
H. G. Stanfield (Progressive)

Results

See also
1948 United States Senate elections

Notes

References 

1948
Kentucky
United States Senate